Stanley Anderson (October 23, 1939 – June 24, 2018) was an American character actor who played Drew Carey's father on The Drew Carey Show.

Early years
Born in Billings, Montana, Anderson attended Garfield Elementary School, Lincoln Junior High School, and Billings Senior High School. He graduated from San Jose State University in the 1960s with a master's degree in theatre.

He had two years of military service in Korea, where he served in a broadcasting post that he compared to the film Good Morning, Vietnam. Between returning from Korea and becoming an actor, he worked with display advertising in California.

Career 
Anderson began his professional acting career in 1967. Prior to 1990 and his work in film and television, Anderson had spent 23 years in over 200 productions as a professional actor working at Arena Stage, ACT, The Actors Company, and the California Shakespeare Festival, among others.

After undergraduate and graduate work at San Jose State University, where he appeared in 16 productions, he and his wife, actress Judith Long, moved to Seattle, Washington, where they spent three years at the Seattle Repertory Theatre. After two years at Actors Theatre in Louisville, Kentucky, Anderson headed to Washington, D.C., to join the Arena Stage. His debut with Arena Stage was in the starring role of Randle McMurphy in One Flew Over the Cuckoo's Nest. Anderson went on to spend 17 years with Arena Stage, appearing in nearly 100 of their productions. During the years he was active in Arena Stage, Anderson lived with his wife and their son in Springfield, Virginia. In the mid-2000s they moved to the Los Angeles area of California.

In the early 1970s, Anderson was a member of the board of directors of Actors Company of Ann Arbor, Michigan, in addition to acting with the group.

Anderson's films include Deceived, RoboCop 3 and The Pelican Brief. He appeared in Michael Bay's movies The Rock and Armageddon; in both films, he played the role of the US president. His TV guest appearances include The Practice, The X-Files, and "Judge Vandelay" in the Seinfeld episode "The Finale". Anderson also worked as voiceover talent for National Geographic, Discovery Channel, The Learning Channel, PBS, and the History Channel documentaries.

Death
Anderson died of brain cancer on June 24, 2018, at the age of 78.

Filmography

The Imagemaker (1986) .... Tony LaCorte (voice)
Son of the Morning Star (1991) .... Ulysses S. Grant
He Said, She Said (1991) .... Bill Weller
Deceived (1991) .... Det. Kinsella
L.A. Law (2 episodes, 1991–1993) .... Dr. Carlson
RoboCop 3 (1993) .... Zack
The Pelican Brief (1993) .... Edwin Sneller
Murder Between Friends (1994) .... Casey
Canadian Bacon (1995) .... Edwin S. Simon, NBS News Anchor
City Hall (1996) .... Train Conductor
Primal Fear (1996) .... Archbishop Richard Rushman
The Rock (1996) .... The President (uncredited)
Shadow Conspiracy (1997) .... Atty. Gen. Toyanbee
The Shining (1997, mini TV Series) .... Delbert Grady
Seinfeld (1998) .... Judge Vandelay
Armageddon (1998) .... The President
Chicago Hope (1 episode, 1999) .... Dr. Windsor
Arlington Road (1999) .... Dr. Archer Scobee
Just Shoot Me! (1 episode, 1999) .... Minister
Judging Amy (1 episode, 1999) .... Thomas Carr
Waking the Dead (2000) .... Fielding's Father
The X Files (1 episode, 2000) .... Agent Schoniger 
The Kid (2000) .... Bob Riley
Proof of Life (2000) .... Jerry
Ally McBeal (1 episode, 2001) .... Judge Walter McDonald
Crossing Jordan (1 episode, 2001) .... Pat Donnelly
Roswell (1 episode, 2001) .... Jim Valenti, Sr.
40 Days and 40 Nights (2002) .... Pater Maher
Spider-Man (2002) .... General Slocum
S1m0ne (2002) .... Frank Brand
Red Dragon (2002) .... Jimmy Price
Law & Order (2 episodes, 1991-2003) .... Jerry Manley / Nelson Lambert
Legally Blonde 2: Red, White & Blonde (2003) .... Michael Blaine
Runaway Jury (2003) .... Henry Jankle
American Dreams (2 episodes, 2002–2003) .... Father Ryan
The Practice (3 episodes, 1997–2004) .... Dr. Gale / Psychiatrist
The Drew Carey Show (10 episodes, 1995–2004) .... George Carey
The Last Shot (2004) .... Howard Schatz / Ben Cartwright
NYPD Blue (2 episodes, 1994–2005) .... Robert Heilbrenner / Professor John Goldman (final appearance)

Self
When the Earth Quakes (1990) (TV) .... Narrator
Richard I: The Lion Heart (1994)
Ancient Mysteries (1996) TV Series .... Narrator (Origin of the Vampire) (unknown episodes)
 ... aka Ancient Mysteries: New Investigations of the Unsolved (USA: video title)

References

External links
 
 
 

1939 births
2018 deaths
American male film actors
American male television actors
People from Billings, Montana
San Jose State University alumni
Male actors from Montana
Deaths from brain cancer in the United States